Å is a village in Senja Municipality in Troms og Finnmark county, Norway. The village is home to 132 residents (2001).

The village of Å is located on the southern part of the island of Senja. The village is located near the Åvatnet lake and is in the Ådalen valley. About  to the west is Skrollsvika where there is a ferry connection to Harstad.

Name
The village (originally a farm) was first mentioned in 1610 ("Aa"). The name is from Old Norse á, which means "(small) river".

References

Villages in Troms
Populated places of Arctic Norway
Senja